Russell Timothy Blake (born 24 July 1935) is an English former professional footballer who played as a winger for Colchester United.

Biography
Born in Colchester in Essex, Blake signed for Colchester in 1955. He made his debut against Leyton Orient on 8 September 1955, and went on to make 58 appearances for the club, scoring eight goals. He left the club in 1961 and signed for non-League Sudbury Town.

References

Living people
1935 births
Sportspeople from Colchester
English footballers
Association football wingers
Colchester United F.C. players
Sudbury Town F.C. players